Joanna Truffaut is a French Digital transformation advisor and entrepreneur. Truffaut has played an influential role in leading awareness creation and developing free Wi-Fi networks in urban areas in the US and France, and has launched Internet start-ups in the Middle East. She now specializes in advising public institutions, cities and media firms on the opportunities and threats of digital experience and technology in their overall business strategy. Truffaut is an alumna of Institut Mines-Télécom and of Virginia Tech.

Career
In 2001, Truffaut became a member of NYC wireless executive team, a non-profit organization that advocates and enables the growth of free, public wireless Internet access in New York City and surrounding areas, and cofounded by Anthony M. Townsend.

Subsequently, in 2003, Truffaut co-founded Paris Open Network, which aimed to enable the growth of free Wi-Fi networks in the city of Paris. She became a recognised figure in France for the evangelisation of free urban Wi-Fi networks and co-wrote her first book. During that time period in Europe, she worked in the ICT Innovation transfer field for a branch of the French Ministry of Industry and Economy and then for a start-up, Cityneo, which later got bought out by Pure Agency.

After her move to the Middle East, Truffaut founded Ibtikarati, the first start-up platform in the Middle East in 2012, which allowed entrepreneurs to sell their apps through the online portal.

In 2013, she founded Ejaba.com, an online business Q&A platform in the Middle East, that allowed entrepreneurs to ask business related questions to a network of experts against a fee.

Bibliography
Le guide du Wi-Fi et du Bluetooth by Joanna Truffaut, Guy de Lussigny, Bertrand Grossier - Editions Eska, January 2004 - 
L’annee des TIC by Joanna Truffaut, Michel Berne – INT – Laboratoire OSTIC, 2005
Territoires et sociétés de l'information en France by Bruno Salgues with Joanna Truffaut contribution - CRITIC, 2003

References

External links

Conference speech on smart government – video in English
 

Living people
Businesspeople in information technology
Women innovators
21st-century French businesswomen
21st-century French businesspeople
Virginia Tech alumni
1977 births